The 2006–07 Men's EuroFloorball Cup Finals took place in Varberg, Sweden from 3 to 7 January 2007. Allmänna Idrottsklubben Innebandyförening, better known simply as AIK, won the EuroFloorball Cup after narrowly defeating Warberg IC 6–5.

The tournament was known as the 2006–07 Men's European Cup, but due to name implications, is now known as the 2006–07 Men's EuroFloorball Cup.

Championship results

Preliminary round

Conference A

Conference B

Playoffs

Semi-finals

Bronze-medal match

Championship Match

Placement round

7th-place match

5th-place match

Standings

External links
Standings & Statistics

EuroFloorball Cup
2007 in floorball